Elliot Maginot is the stage name of Gabriel Hélie-Harvey, a Canadian singer-songwriter from Quebec. He is most noted for his 2021 album Easy Morning, which was longlisted for the 2021 Polaris Music Prize and was a Félix Award nominee for Anglophone Album of the Year at the 44th Félix Awards in 2022.

Maginot writes and performs in English despite being a francophone Quebecer.

Discography
Young/Old​/​Everything.In.Between (2014)
Comrades (2018)
Easy Morning (2021)

References

External links

21st-century Canadian male singers
Canadian male singer-songwriters
Canadian pop singers
Canadian indie rock musicians
French Quebecers
Singers from Quebec
Living people
Year of birth missing (living people)